Joe Rickard is an American drummer, record producer and mixing engineer. He was the drummer for the Christian rock band Red from 2008 through 2014 and Swedish heavy metal band In Flames from 2016 through 2019. He then began primarily writing, mixing and producing, often working with music producer Howard Benson.

Biography 
Rickard started drumming at the age of 13. At the age of 17, when he was in high school, he started playing music professionally.  He was auditioned by a band called Sky Harbor and left his home and highschool to pursue his musical career.

Rickard is the former drummer for Swedish heavy metal band In Flames and Grammy Award-nominated band Red. He has performed on The Tonight Show with Jay Leno and The Conan O'Brien Show, and was voted one of the Up & Coming Drummers of 2010 by Modern Drummer Magazine. In November 2007, Rickard replaced Hayden Lamb as the drummer of Red. In 2014, after spending six years, three albums and numerous tours with Red, Rickard decided to leave the band. He joined Swedish metal band In Flames in 2016. Rickard was the drummer for In Flames until 2019.

After touring in several bands and performing on various albums, Rickard has now become a full time producer, mixer, and writer. He has worked with Three Days Grace, Apocalyptica, 10 Years, Starset, Another Day Dawns, Love And Death, Brian Welch, Diamante, Keith Wallen of Breaking Benjamin, Rob Graves, Trevor McNevan of Thousand Foot Krutch, Manafest, The Wedding, and Islander. He also works for music producer Howard Benson on a regular basis, mixing several of his recent releases.

Discography

References

External links 
 
 
 

Living people
American heavy metal drummers
Year of birth missing (living people)
In Flames members
Red (band) members